The Prince-Bishopric of Strasburg was an ecclesiastical principality of the Holy Roman Empire from the 13th century until 1803. During the late 17th century, most of its territory was annexed by France; this consisted of the areas on the left bank of the Rhine, around the towns of Saverne, Molsheim, Benfeld, Dachstein, Dambach, Dossenheim-Kochersberg, Erstein, Kästenbolz, Rhinau, and the Mundat (consisting of Rouffach, Soultz, and Eguisheim). The annexations were recognized by the Holy Roman Empire in the Treaty of Ryswick of 1697. Only the part of the state that was to the east of the Rhine remained; it consisted of areas around the towns of Oberkirch, Ettenheim, and Oppenau. This territory was secularized to Baden in 1803.

See also 
 Archbishop of Strasbourg
 Archdiocese of Strasbourg
 Palais Rohan, Strasbourg
 Episcopal Palace (Strasbourg)
 Strasbourg Bishops' War

Notes

References

External links 
 Official site of the diocese
 Official site of the cathedral

Strasbourg
Prince-Bishopric
Catholic League (German)
Upper Rhenish Circle
Former states and territories of Baden-Württemberg
980s establishments in the Holy Roman Empire
1803 disestablishments in the Holy Roman Empire
982 establishments